Alvania grancanariensis is a species of minute sea snail, a marine gastropod mollusk or micromollusk in the family Rissoidae.

Distribution
The species has been founded on the shores of the island of Gran Canaria.

References

Rissoidae
Gastropods described in 1999
Molluscs of the Canary Islands
Fauna of the Canary Islands